Anders Rapp (1927–1998) was a Swedish geomorphologist and geographer who pioneered quantitative geomorphological approach on mass movements and erosion. He was the first to make a comprehensive study on avalanche boulder tongues. Most of Rapp's works were made in the Scandinavian mountains and Spitsbergen including the areas of Kärkevagge near Abisko and Kebnekaise.

Studying under Filip Hjulström, Rapp got his Ph.D. at Uppsala University in 1961, and was appointed professor of physical geography at Lund University in 1977. In 1980, he was elected a member of the Royal Swedish Academy of Sciences.

References

Swedish geographers
Uppsala University alumni
Academic staff of Lund University
Members of the Royal Swedish Academy of Sciences
1998 deaths
1927 births
Climatic geomorphologists
Process geomorphologists
Swedish geomorphologists
20th-century geographers